Billings Park is a GAA ground in Dún Laoghaire–Rathdown, Ireland. It is one of the sports pitches at University College Dublin and is located on its Belfield campus. The pitch is named after Dave Billings, a former UCD student who spent 18 years as Head of Gaelic Games in UCD.	

It was one of the venues for the 2017 Women's Rugby World Cup.

References

Belfield, Dublin
Buildings and structures in Dún Laoghaire–Rathdown
Sports venues in Dún Laoghaire–Rathdown
Sport at University College Dublin
University College Dublin R.F.C.
University College Dublin A.F.C.
UCD GAA